Tynyshbaev, russfied as Tynyshpaev is a Kazakh surname. The name derives from male given name Tynyshbai which means "quiet rich man" and is literally translated as Tynyshbai's. The surname in feminine is written as Tynyshbaeva.  
	
People with the surname include:
 
 Mukhamedzhan Tynyshpaev

References 

	
Kazakh-language surnames